Beaupré Creek is a stream in Alberta, Canada.

Beaupré Creek has the name of a pioneer citizen.

See also
List of rivers of Alberta

References

Rivers of Alberta